Alfred Henry Love (September 7, 1830 – June 29, 1913) of Philadelphia, Pennsylvania, was an American political activist.

Biography
Love was born on September 7, 1830, to William H. Love and Rachel Evans. He married Susan Henry Brown in Burlington, New Jersey, on January 13, 1853.

He founded the Universal Peace Union in Providence, Rhode Island, in 1866 and served as its president until his death. In the 1888 U.S. presidential election, he was the Vice Presidential nominee of the National Equal Rights Party as the running mate of Belva Ann Lockwood. Love withdrew before the election and was replaced by Charles Stuart Wells.

Among his activities, Love tried to support gaining justice for American Indian tribes in the West, who were being forced off traditional lands onto reservations, often located hundreds of miles distant from their old territories. In 1875, he met with Alfred B. Meacham, a member of the peace commission to end the Modoc War, and members of the Modoc people, including Toby Riddle and Frank Riddle, who were on a national lecture tour.

In 1906, Love was nominated for a Nobel Peace Prize by eight United States Senators and Hannis Taylor. He also was nominated in 1903 by Andrew Palm and in 1904 by Edvard Wavrinsky.

He died on June 29, 1913, in Philadelphia, Pennsylvania.

Bibliography
 An Appeal In Vindication Of Peace Principles (1862)

Notes

Further reading
 Robert Doherty, Alfred H. Love and the Universal Peace Union (1962)
 Thomas F. Curran, Soldiers of Peace: Civil War Pacifism and the Postwar Radical Peace Movement (2003) 
 Nichole Mitchell, "Love, Alfred Henry", Home Front Heroes: A Biographical Dictionary of Americans During Wartime (2007), pp. 539–541
 Universal Peace Union Records, (1846-1866), 1867-1923, 1938, Swarthmore College Holdings include Love's diaries.

American pacifists
Activists from Philadelphia
Political activists from Pennsylvania
1888 United States vice-presidential candidates
1830 births
1913 deaths
National Equal Rights Party politicians